Tsudakhar (Dargwa: Цӏудахъар) is a rural locality (a selo) and the administrative centre of Tsudakharsky Selsoviet, Levashinsky District, Republic of Dagestan, Russia. The population was 1,355 as of 2010. There are 6 streets.

Geography 
Tsudakhar is located 27 km southwest of Levashi (the district's administrative centre) by road, on the Kazikumukhskoye Koysu River. Inkuchimakhi and Karekadani are the nearest rural localities.

Nationalities 
Dargins live there.

Famous residents 
 Kara Karayev (commander of the Dagestan volunteer cavalry squadron)
 Magomed-Salam Umakhanov (Soviet and Dagestan political and party doer)
 Khabibulla Amirkhanov (Soviet physicist)
 Murad Gadzhiev (Russian political and social doer)
 Ruslan Magomedov (Russian mixed martial arts fighter)

References 

Rural localities in Levashinsky District